"Foo?" (Stylized as foo?) is the second  album by the Japanese rock band Porno Graffitti, it was released on February 28, 2001.

Released almost a year after their last album, "Romantist Egoist", the album contains 12 tracks including three hit singles from 2000: "Music Hour", "Saudade" and "Saboten". 

The album's title is a play on the words "Hi, Fu, Mi" (ひぃふぅみぃ/One, Two, Three) from the fact that it is their second album, and the English phrase "Who?". The cover photo is a pink square tile, and Akimitsu Honma revealed that the shadow on the tile is Tama.

The album ranked #2 for weekly Oricon charts.

Track listing

References

2001 albums
Porno Graffitti albums
Japanese-language albums
Sony Music albums